Carabus ulrichii is a species of ground beetle from the family Carabidae originating from the Central Hungarian Basin and found in Bulgaria, the Czech Republic, Germany, Great Britain, Hungary, Luxembourg, Moldova, Poland, Romania, Slovakia, Ukraine, and all of the republics of the former Yugoslavia. They are coloured black, with a green pronotum. The species formation happened in Pleistocene.

References

Tembrock,g.(2004). Historical biogeography and phylogeny of a carabid beetle (Carabus ullrichi Germ.). Deutsche Entomologische Zeitschrift, 1-48.

External links
Carabus ullrichii on You Tube

Beetles described in 1824
Beetles of Europe
Carabus